WKYR-FM (107.9 FM) is a radio station broadcasting a country music format. Licensed to Burkesville, Kentucky, United States, it is owned by Connie Crabtree through licensee River Country Communications, LLC, and features programming from ABC Radio  and Jones Radio Network.

History
WKYR-FM first signed on the air as WKYI-FM in 1988, before quickly changing calls to the current WKYR-FM. The station was launched as a companion to the daytime-only AM station on 1570. WKYR-AM-FM were majority-owned by Ray Mullinix, later a member of the Kentucky House of Representatives.

In the early 2000s, Mullinix would pass away, with his wife Elizabeth taking over ownership of the station. Mrs. Mullinix would lease the station to Jessie Crabtree in 2004, with them purchasing the station in 2007. In 2015, the station would again be sold, this time to current owner Connie Crabtree.

References

External links

KYR-FM
Country radio stations in the United States